The river tyrannulet (Serpophaga hypoleuca) is a species of bird in the family Tyrannidae, the tyrant flycatchers.
It is found in Peru, Venezuela and Brazil; also river extensions into Ecuador, Colombia-(border) and Bolivia.

Its range consists of several Amazon Basin river-corridors and the Orinoco River drainage river corridors, and extending into neighbor countries, or a country-river border. Its natural habitat is subtropical or tropical moist shrubland located along these corridors.

River corridor range
The river tyrannulet is found in the Amazon Basin along four major river wildlife corridors; also two rivers in Venezuela, including the lower Orinoco. The river corridors are mostly contiguous stretches, about 100 to 150 km in width.

The rivers in the Amazon Basin, going upstream are the following: Amazon River, (Tocantins, Araguaia— east of the Xingu), Xingu River, Madeira, and Marañón-Ucayali, (in Amazonian Peru). For the Araguaia River, the bird's range continues only downstream to the Tocantin confluence, then down the Tocantins to the Pacific, (500 km east of the Amazon River outlet; the Xingu River confluence range connects to the Tocantins range.) On the Madeira River, from Amazonian Bolivia, the range only extends into the country by 300 km of the 2300 km Madeira River range. Two other Amazon Basin river regions are:  a tributary to the Marañón-(named the Amazon River downstream) in northern Peru, and a localized, non-corridor region on the lower Branco River, a tributary to the Amazon's Rio Negro.

In Venezuela, the corridor ranges are on the lower half of the Orinoco River, and the Arauca River corridor to the west, on the Colombia-Venezuela border, about 700 km.

References

External links
River tyrannulet photo gallery VIREO
Photo-High Res; Article pbase.com–(Eastern Venezuela)

river tyrannulet
Birds of the Amazon Basin
Birds of Venezuela
river tyrannulet
river tyrannulet
river tyrannulet
Taxonomy articles created by Polbot